Bryant is a Creek Indian Nation townsite in Okmulgee County, Oklahoma, United States. Bryant is southwest of Henryetta and southeast of the town of Pharoah, being both south of Interstate 40 and east of U.S. Route 75 on Bryant Road.

It is the subject of a book by Mickey J. Martin.

Demographics

References 

Unincorporated communities in Oklahoma
Unincorporated communities in Okmulgee County, Oklahoma